Lyces latistriga is a moth of the family Notodontidae first described by Hering in 1925. It is only known from the Andean foothills of south-eastern Peru.

External links
Species page at Tree of Life Web Project

Notodontidae
Moths described in 1925